Dutton Stiles Peterson (December 10, 1894 – October 20, 1964) was an American Methodist minister and politician from New York.

Background
He was born in Costello, Potter County, Pennsylvania. His father, Chris Peterson, was an immigrant from  Holla, Telemark, Norway.
The family removed in 1911 to Steuben County, New York. In 1917, he enlisted in the U.S. Marine Corps and fought in World War I in France. After the war he graduated from Practical Bible Training School (now Davis College) in 1922 and King's School of Oratory. 
He graduated B.A. from Ohio Wesleyan University in 1924; and from Boston University School of Theology in 1927. He became a Methodist minister, and was the pastor of the Methodist Church in Odessa, Schuyler County, New York, from 1937 to 1960.

Political career
He  entered politics as a Republican. Peterson was a member of the New York State Assembly (Schuyler Co.) in 1937, 1938, 1939–40 and 1941–42. He was a member of the New York State Senate from 1953 until his death in 1964, sitting in the 169th, 170th, 171st, 172nd, 173rd and 174th New York State Legislatures.

Personal life
In 1922, he married Martha Melintha Robinson (1899-1985). The couple had six children. He died in Schuyler Hospital in Montour Falls, New York, of a heart attack; and was buried at the Laurel Hill Cemetery in Odessa.

Sources

External links
 

1894 births
1964 deaths
People from Schuyler County, New York
Republican Party New York (state) state senators
Republican Party members of the New York State Assembly
People from Potter County, Pennsylvania
Ohio Wesleyan University alumni
Boston University School of Theology alumni
American people of Norwegian descent
20th-century American politicians